Khijadija is a town and former independent princely state on Saurashtra, Gujarat, western India.

It is apparently identical to Vala Shri Valera Raning alias Vala XIX, one of many fragmented parts of Vala State.

History 
It was a princely state that got evolved from Jetpur state and got independent powers and revenue collection of its own.

After independence it enjoyed a privy Purse (payment made to former royal family of erstwhile princely states) of 40,000 rupees annually.

During the British Raj, the state was under the colonial Eastern Kathiawar Agency.

External links and sources 
 DSAL.UChicago - Kathiawar 

Princely states of Gujarat